Marcos Valadão Ridolfi (formerly Rodolfo, born January 23, 1962), better known by the stage name Nasi, is a Brazilian singer-songwriter, bassist, actor, record producer, radialist, TV presenter former disc jockey, and vocalist for the Brazilian rock bands Ira! and Voluntários da Pátria. He is also a soccer commentator for RedeTV! since 2008.

Discography

Solo
Onde Os Anjos Não Ousam Pisar (2006)
Vivo na Cena – Ao Vivo no Estúdio (2010)

Ira!
Mudança de Comportamento (1985)
Vivendo e Não Aprendendo (1986)
Psicoacústica (1988)
Clandestino (1990)
Meninos da Rua Paulo (1991)
Música Calma para Pessoas Nervosas (1993)
7 (1996)
Você Não Sabe Quem Eu Sou (1998)
Isso é Amor (1999)
MTV ao Vivo (2000)
Entre seus Rins (2001)
Acústico MTV (2004)
Invisível DJ (2007)

Voluntários da Pátria
Voluntários da Pátria (1984)

Nasi and Os Irmãos do Blues
Uma Noite Com Nasi & Os Irmãos do Blues  (1993)
Os Brutos Também Amam  (1996)
O Rei da Cocada Preta  (2000)
Nasi & Os Irmãos do Blues Ao Vivo (Official Bootleg) (2000)

References

1962 births
21st-century Brazilian male singers
21st-century Brazilian singers
Brazilian rock singers
20th-century Brazilian male singers
20th-century Brazilian singers
Singers from São Paulo
Living people
Post-punk musicians
Blues rock musicians
Association football commentators
Brazilian male singer-songwriters